Ambry Thomas (born September 9, 1999) is an American football cornerback for the San Francisco 49ers of the National Football League (NFL). He played college football at Michigan and was drafted by the 49ers in the third round of the 2021 NFL Draft.

Early years
Thomas attended Martin Luther King High School in Detroit, Michigan. He played wide receiver and cornerback. Thomas played in the 2017 U.S. Army All-American Bowl. He committed to the  University of Michigan to play college football.

College career
Thomas spent his first two years at Michigan in 2017 and 2018 as a backup, recording 16 tackles and one interception during the two years. Prior to the 2019 season he spent a month in the hospital after being diagnosed with colitis. After believing he'd have to sit out the year due to the condition, Thomas returned and  he became a starter for the first time. He started all 13 games and had 38 tackles and three interceptions that season. Thomas opted out of the 2020 season and entered the 2021 NFL Draft.

Professional career

Thomas was drafted by the San Francisco 49ers in the third round, 102nd overall, of the 2021 NFL Draft. He signed his four-year rookie contract with San Francisco on July 26, 2021.

On January 9, 2022, Thomas recorded his first career interception, picking off Los Angeles Rams quarterback Matthew Stafford in the last game of the regular season in overtime with the 49ers leading 27–24. The win sent the 49ers to the 2021–22 NFL playoffs.

References

External links
Michigan Wolverines bio

1999 births
Living people
Players of American football from Detroit
American football cornerbacks
Michigan Wolverines football players
San Francisco 49ers players